Paddy McGuirk (born 23 June 1950) is an Irish former golfer. He won the professional Carroll's International tournament at the 1973 European Tour. McGuirk also won the professional Carroll's Irish Match Play Championship tournament at the 1969 and 1982 Southern Ireland Championship.

McGuirk began golfing with his father, Michael McGuirk, at the age of 15. He was a professional golfer since 1966. McGuirk won the Aer Lingus Irish Professional Championship at the Irish PGA Championship in 1976. He retired his professional golfing in 2021.

Professional wins (4)

European Tour wins (1)

Other wins (3)
1969 Carroll's Irish Match Play Championship
1976 Aer Lingus Irish Professional Championship
1982 Carroll's Irish Match Play Championship

References

External links 

Irish male golfers
European Tour golfers
1950 births
Living people